The FCD Anniversary Open is a darts tournament held in Calella, Catalunya. It has been held since 2015 when the Federació Catalana de Dards celebrated the 25th anniversary of its foundation. 
Always been held on Calella the same weekenend of Catalonia Open Darts.

This competicion is organizate by Federació Catalana de Dards (FCD) and is ranked for World Darts Federation (WDF) and British Darts Organisation (BDO).

In 2020 the competition was canceled due to the Covid-19 pandemic

List of winners

Men's

Women's

External links
Catalonia Open Darts at dardscatalunya.cat
http://www.dartsdatabase.co.uk/FCD Anniversary Open Winners

2015 establishments in Spain
Darts tournaments